Locoal-Mendon is a commune in the Morbihan department of Brittany in north-western France.

Toponymy
Known as Locus Sancti Guitali in 1037 and Sanctus Gudualus in 1387.
From the Breton lok which means hermitage (cf.: Locminé), and Goal which is a name for the Breton saint Gudwal, Gurval or Gutual, eponym also of Gulval.
Mendon is derives probably from the Breton men which means rock and don which means deep.

Breton language
In 2008, there was 17,81% of the children attended the bilingual schools in primary education.

See also
Communes of the Morbihan department

References

External links

 Cultural Heritage 
 Mayors of Morbihan Association 

Communes of Morbihan